This is a list of naval ship classes that were in service with the Bundesmarine (navy of West Germany), or are still in service with the German Navy (navy of reunited Germany). Some projects, that were not built or future designs are also present.

The type codes
The post-war navy of western Germany introduced a three digit code system to designate every class of vessel they ordered to design or acquired from foreign nations. Even some classes that were only built for export got such codes, most prominently the Type 209 submarine. After reunification the German Navy kept the system, codes for ships from the former forces of East Germany (Volksmarine) were added. (See #Former NVA units).

The code is sometimes prefixed with a letter according to the category of the ships, e.g.:
 U for submarines (U-Boot)
 Z for destroyer (Zerstörer)
 F for frigates (Fregatten)
 S for fast attack craft (Schnellboote)

Upgrades to the design or major refits of already built ships are marked with a postfixed letter, beginning with A for the first modification. This letter is usually spoken and sometimes written according to the NATO Phonetic Alphabet, e.g. class 206 alpha for the upgraded Type 206 submarine.

The codes are grouped with a two-level categorization, the first digit defines the first category. Categories are usually further subdivided in blocks.

In each block of type codes, the numbers were assigned chronologically for designed types. Classes acquired from foreign nation or from World War II were given numbers near the end of their block. Sometimes a block is further divided, e.g. Types 120–139 have apparently been split in frigates (120–129) and corvettes (130–139) with the upcoming Type 130 corvette.

The type codes starting with 0 are not used, and also the digit 0 is skipped at the start of a category, i.e. codes 000–099, 100, 200… are not used.

Individual ships in a class are designated with two digit number following a slash, e.g. 123/02 for the frigate F216 Schleswig-Holstein, second ship of the Type 123 Brandenburg class.

List of classes

100-199 surface combatants

200–299 subsurface combatants

Type numbers 250–299 are not assigned.

300–399 mine warfare vessels

Type numbers 380–389 Netzleger und Netzleichter (net layers and net lighters) were cancelled projects.

400–499 auxiliary ships

500–599 landing craft

600–699 small combatants
This category was formally not used. Small NVA combatants were assigned here.

700–799 support vessels, docks, tugs, special vehicles

800–899
This range of Type numbers is not allocated.

900–999 Safety, rescue, liaison & boats for special purposes

920–929 Sportboote (yachts) are unassigned.

Type numbers 966–999 are not allocated.

Former NVA units
After the unification of the German Navies, the Eastern German ship classes got Type codes of the Western system. Especially for those that were soon sold afterwards to foreign navies, this process did not strictly follow the previous rules. Sometimes already allocated codes were reused or the previously spared x00 codes were assigned. But the vast majority was categorized in the previously unused 600-699 range, but even here the same Type code is often used more than once. And sometimes, ships of the same class are spread over different Type codes.

References

Schiffsnummernverzeichnis für Schiffe, Boote und Betriebsfahrzeuge der Deutschen Marine und des Wehrtechnischen Bereichs (as of December 2002), Bundesamt für Wehrtechnik und Beschaffung, Koblenz/Germany